Didar Qoli (also Romanized as Dīdār Qolī) is a village in Susan-e Sharqi Rural District, Susan District, Izeh County, Khuzestan Province, Iran. At the 2006 census, its population was 53, in 9 families.

References 

Populated places in Izeh County